USS Muskingum (AK-198/T-AK-198) was an  that was constructed for the US Navy under a US Maritime Commission (MARCOM) contract during the closing period of World War II. She supported the end-of-war Navy effort. On 7 March 1946 Muskingum was placed in service under bareboat charter with the US Army under the Shipping Control Authority for the Japanese Merchant Marine with a Japanese crew. In 1950, she was reactivated and placed into service with the Military Sea Transportation Service as USNS Muskingum (T-AK-198) until being struck from the Navy list in 1973. She was ultimately transferred to the Trust Territory of the Pacific Islands (TTPI) and the Republic of Palau.

Construction
Muskingum, a type C1-M-AV1 cargo ship was laid down under a MARCOM contract, MC hull 2152, by Globe Shipbuilding Co., Superior, Wisconsin, 26 January 1944, and launched on 30 June 1944; sponsored by Mrs. Henry Larson. Muskingum was then completed at Samuelson Ship Yard, Beaumont, Texas. She was commissioned on 24 April 1945, at Houston, Texas.

Service history

World War II-related service
After shakedown, she departed Gulfport, Mississippi, 26 May 1945 with cargo for the Pacific Ocean. She arrived at Subic Bay, Philippine Islands, 4 August 1945 via the Panama Canal and Manus, the Admiralty Islands. The next few months were spent in carrying passengers and freight between Philippine ports.

She departed Tacloban, Leyte, 24 January 1946, arriving Yokohama 31 January. The ship was decommissioned 7 March 1946 and turned over to the War Shipping Administration (WSA) for transfer to the U.S. Army Transportation Corps on a bareboat charter basis. She was stricken from the Navy List 5 June 1946.

Army service
Muskingum was given the Army designation V-208 and operated between ports in Japan, Korea, and the Mariana Islands under control of the Shipping Control Authority for the Japanese Merchant Marine (SCAJAP) with overall control exercised by Supreme Commander of Allied Forces, Japan. Muskingum was operated by Japanese until 1 July 1950 when title was transferred to Navy.

MSTS service
Muskingum was reinstated on the Navy List for operations under Military Sea Transportation Service (MSTS) WesPac (Western Pacific). During the Korean War, she carried supplies between Japan and Korea.
 
In 1951, Muskingum, designated T-AK-198, was under control of MSTS Far East, operating out of Japan. Besides providing logistical support for U.S. forces in Korea, Muskingum carried supplies to American and Allied forces in South Vietnam.

Decommissioning
Muskingum continued with service with the Military Sea Transportation Service (MSTS) until she was struck from the Navy List on 15 June 1973.

Merchant service
On 4 October 1973, title was returned to the Maritime Administration, successor to the Maritime Commission and loaned to the United States Department of Interior for TTPI use. The ship was operated by the Palau Shipping Company, Inc., a Trust Territory entity, on a time charter basis with a Micronesian crew. On 7 April 1982 Muskingum was permanently transferred to the Republic of Palau. According to the ABC Shipping Guide the ship was operated by Carolineship with a route Palau - Jakarta - Kobe - Palau.

The ship was scrapped in 1982.

Honors and awards
Qualified Muskingum personnel were eligible for the following:
 American Campaign Medal
 Asiatic-Pacific Campaign Medal
 World War II Victory Medal
 Navy Occupation Service Medal (with Asia clasp)
 National Defense Service Medal
 Vietnam Service Medal 
 Philippines Liberation Medal
 Republic of Vietnam Campaign Medal

Notes 

Citations

Bibliography 

Online resources

External links

 

Alamosa-class cargo ships
Ships built in Superior, Wisconsin
1944 ships
World War II auxiliary ships of the United States
Type C1-M ships of the United States Army
Korean War auxiliary ships of the United States
Vietnam War auxiliary ships of the United States
Muskingum County, Ohio
Ships transferred from the United States Navy to the Trust Territory of the Pacific Islands